Coryanthes trifoliata is a species of orchid found in Peru.

References

External links

trifoliata
Orchids of Peru